Marcel Titsch-Rivero (born 2 November 1989) is a German professional footballer who plays as a midfielder.

Career
Titsch-Rivero debuted in the Bundesliga for Eintracht Frankfurt in a match at 1899 Hoffenheim on 12 December 2009.

Personal life
He is of Spanish origin.

References

External links
 
 Marcel Titsch-Rivero at eintracht-archiv.de 
 

1989 births
Living people
German footballers
German people of Spanish descent
Eintracht Frankfurt players
Eintracht Frankfurt II players
1. FC Heidenheim players
SV Wehen Wiesbaden players
Hallescher FC players
Bundesliga players
Association football midfielders
Footballers from Frankfurt
3. Liga players